Sam Leach (born 1973) is an Australian contemporary artist. He was born in Adelaide, South Australia. Leach worked for many years in the Australian Tax Office after completion of a degree in Economics. He also completed a Diploma of Art, Bachelor of Fine Art degree and a Master of Fine Art degree at RMIT in Melbourne, Victoria. Leach currently resides in Melbourne.
Leach's work has been exhibited in several museum shows including "Optimism" at the Queensland Art Gallery and "Neo Goth" at the University of Queensland Art Museum in 2008, in 2009 "the Shilo Project" at the Ian Potter Museum of Art  and "Horror Come Darkness" at the Macquarie University Art Gallery  and "Still" at Hawkesbury Regional Gallery in 2010. His work is held in public collections of regional galleries of Geelong, Gold Coast, Coffs Harbour, Newcastle and Gippsland and the collections of La Trobe University and the University of Queensland.

His portrait of musical comedian Tim Minchin won the Archibald Prize, one of Australia's most noteworthy art prizes, in 2010. In the same year, he won the Wynne Prize for his landscape Proposal for landscaped cosmos. In doing so he became only the third artist after William Dobell and Brett Whiteley to win the Archibald portrait prize and the Wynne landscape prize in the same year. The award has generated some controversy  due to the similarities, acknowledged by Leach, between his work  and one by seventeenth-century Dutch artist Adam Pynacker.

Awards and prizes 
2010 Archibald Prize, Art Gallery of New South Wales, Sydney, winner
2010 Wynne Prize, Art Gallery of New South Wales, Sydney, winner
2010 RMIT Alumnus of the Year Award, RMIT University, Melbourne
2009 Eutick Memorial Still Life Award, Coffs Harbour Regional Gallery, Coffs Harbour, finalist
2009 Royal Bank of Scotland Emerging Artist Award, Sydney, finalist
2009 University of Queensland Self Portrait Prize, Brisbane, finalist
2009 Arthur Guy Memorial Prize, Bendigo Art Gallery, Bendigo, finalist
2009 Waterhouse Natural History Prize, South Australian Museum, Adelaide, finalist
2009 Archibald Prize, Art Gallery of New South Wales, Sydney, finalist
2008 Stan and Maureen Duke Gold Coast Art Prize, Gold Coast City Gallery, Gold Coast, finalist
2008 Waterhouse Natural History Art Prize, South Australian Museum, Adelaide, commendation
2008 Fleurieu Biennale, Art of Food and Wine and Water Prize, McLaren Vale, winner
2008 ABN Amro Emerging Artist Award, Sydney, finalist
2008 Archibald Prize, Art Gallery of New South Wales, Sydney, finalist
2007 Siemens Fine Art Award, RMIT University, Melbourne, winner
2007 Eutick Memorial Still Life Award, Coffs Harbour Regional Gallery, Coffs Harbour, finalist
2007 Stan and Maureen Duke, Gold Coast Art Prize, Gold Coast City Gallery, Gold Coast, finalist 
2007 Metro5 Art Award, Metro Gallery, Melbourne, finalist
2007 Archibald Prize, Art Gallery of New South Wales, Sydney, finalist
2006 Fletcher Jones Contemporary Art Prize, Geelong Gallery, Art Geelong, winner
2006 Metro5 Art Award, Metro Gallery, Melbourne, winner
2005 Siemens Fine Art Award, RMIT University, Melbourne, finalist
2004 Siemens Fine Art Award, RMIT University, Melbourne, finalist

Collections 
Leach's work features in several collections including
Artbank
Art Gallery of South Australia, Adelaide
Coffs Harbour Regional Gallery, Coffs Harbour 
Christ Church Grammar School, Perth 
Geelong Art Gallery, Geelong 
Gippsland Art Gallery, Victoria
Gold Coast City Gallery, Gold Coast 
La Trobe University Museum of Art, Melbourne 
Monash University Museum of Art, Melbourne
Newcastle Art Gallery, Newcastle 
Peggy Scott and David Teplitzky Collection, Wellington, New Zealand
RMIT University, Melbourne
University of Queensland Art Museum, Brisbane 
Western Plains Cultural Centre, Dubbo

Exhibitions

Solo exhibitions 
Leach's work has been the subject of numerous solo exhibitions.
2014 Theriophily and Substance, ART14 London
2013 Careening Meteorites and the Early Mind, Future Perfect, Singapore
2013 Sam Leach, Future Perfect, Singapore
2013 Dymaxion, Sullivan+Strumpf, Sydney
2012 The Civilising Process, VOLTA8, Sullivan+Strumpf, Basel, Switzerland
2011-12 Sam Leach: The Ecstasy of Infrastructure, TarraWarra Museum of Art, Healesville
2011 We Have Never Been Modern, ARTHK11, Sullivan+Strumpf, Asia One, Hong Kong Convention and Exhibition Centre, Hong Kong
2010 Present at Hand, Sullivan+Strumpf, Sydney 
2010 Platonia, COMODAA, London, UK
2010 Cosmists, 24HR ART, Northern Territory Centre for Contemporary Art, Darwin 
2009 The Next Billion Years, Sullivan+Strumpf, Sydney
2009 The Margin, Nellie Castan Gallery, Melbourne
2009 Native Dualism, Peter Walker Fine Art, Adelaide
2008 Holotypes, Nellie Castan Gallery, Melbourne
2008 Negentrophies, Sullivan+Strumpf, Sydney
2007 Unnatural Selection, Peter Walker Fine Art, Adelaide
2007 The Spoils, Nellie Castan Gallery, Melbourne
2006 Familie Kapitaal, Michael Carr Gallery, Sydney
2005 The Lift, Spacement, Melbourne
2005 The Longed for Departure, Bus Gallery, Melbourne

Group exhibitions 
Leach's work has been featured in numerous group exhibitions.
2015 10th Anniversary Group Show, Sullivan+Strumpf, Sydney
2014 Conquest of Space, COFA Galleries, Sydney, curated by Dr. Andrew Frost
2014 Art Basel Hong Kong, Sullivan+Strumpf, Hong Kong
2014 The Medium is the Message, La Trobe University Museum of Art, Victoria
2014 SSFA14, Sullivan+Strumpf, Sydney
2013 Melbourne Now, National Gallery of Victoria, Melbourne
2013 Australia: Contemporary Voices, The Fine Art Society Contemporary, London, UK
2013 SkyLab, La Trobe Regional Gallery, Victoria
2013 New Horizons, Gippsland Art Gallery, Sale
2013 Wonderworks, Cat Street Gallery, Hong Kong
2012 Haunts and Follies, Linden Centre for Contemporary Art, Melbourne
2012 Animal/Human, University of Queensland Art Museum, University of Queensland, Brisbane
2012 Lie of the Land: New Australian Landscapes, Embassy of Australia, Washington DC, USA
2011 Imagining the Future, RMIT Gallery, RMIT University, Melbourne
2011 Unknown Pleasures, Gippsland Art Gallery, Sale
2011 The Rapture of Death, Gippsland Art Gallery, Sale
2011 The New Arcadia, Lismore Regional Gallery, Lismore
2011 First Life Residency in Landscape, Xin Dong Cheng Space for Contemporary Art, Beijing, China
2011 Together in Harmony, Korean Foundation Cultural Centre, Seoul, South Korea
2011 SSFA11, Sullivan+Strumpf, Sydney
2011 Art Stage Singapore, Sullivan+Strumpf, Marina Bay Sands, Singapore
2010 ARTHK10, Sullivan+Strump, Hong Kong Convention and Exhibition Centre, Hong Kong
2010 SSFA10, Sullivan+Strumpf, Sydney 
2010 Archibald Prize, Art Gallery of New South Wales, Sydney
2010 Wynne Prize, Art Gallery of New South Wales, Sydney
2009 Horror – Come Darkness, Macquarie University Art Gallery, Sydney 
2009 The Shilo Project, Ian Potter Museum of Art, University of Melbourne, Melbourne and touring
2009 Nature ID, Jan Manton Gallery, Brisbane 
2009 Australia Now, Bedfordbury Gallery, London, UK
2009 Surveying the Field, Moreland City Art Gallery, Melbourne
2009 Mute Relics and Bedevilled Creatures – Constructing an Antipodean Curio Cabinet, Moreland City Art Gallery,
Melbourne
2009 SSFA09, Sullivan+Strumpf, Sydney 
2008 Contemporary Australia: Optimism, Queensland Art Gallery/Gallery of Modern Art, Brisbane
2008 The Year of the Bird, Hawkesbury Regional Gallery, Sydney 
2008 Heat: Art and Climate Change, RMIT Gallery, RMIT University, Melbourne
2008 Neo Goth: Back in Black, University of Queensland Art Museum, Brisbane
2008 Melbourne Art Fair, Sullivan+Strumpf, Royal Exhibition Centre, Melbourne
2008 Archibald Prize, Art Gallery of New South Wales, Sydney
2008 SSFA08, Sullivan+Strumpf, Sydney
2008 Bal Tashchit: Thou Shalt Not Destroy – The Environment in Biblical and Rabbinic Sources, Jewish Museum of Australia, Melbourne
2007 Momento Mori, Blkmrkt, Brisbane
2007 Sincerity of Detail, Wardlow Studios, Melbourne
2007 Metro 5 Finalists, Metro Gallery, Melbourne
2007 Archibald Prize, Art Gallery of New South Wales, Sydney
2006 Metro 5 Finalists, Metro Gallery, Melbourne
2006 Melbourne Reign, Michael Carr Gallery, Sydney
2004 RMIT Honours Graduate Show, Area Contemporary Art Space, Melbourne
2004 8, RMIT Gallery, RMIT University, Melbourne
2004 Melbourne Commonwealth Games Village, Melbourne
2003 Thread, RMIT Graduate Show, Melbourne

See also
Archibald prize

References

External links

ABC Sunday arts
The Age newspaper
Review of The Spoils, exhibition at Nellie Castan Gallery by Tony Lloyd (Artist)
Opinion piece on the controversial self portrait by Tony Lloyd (Artist)
australianedge.net interview
Sam Leach, 2011, ARTIST PROFILE Issue 16, pp. 56-63

1973 births
Living people
Australian painters
Artists from Melbourne
Archibald Prize winners
RMIT University alumni
Wynne Prize winners
Australian portrait painters